"Oh My Love" is a song written by John Lennon and Yoko Ono that appeared on Lennon's Imagine album in 1971.

Information
The song was originally written with different lyrics and demoed in 1968 after sessions for the album The Beatles. This demo was released on many Beatles bootleg albums.

Recorded on 28 May 1971 at Ascot Sound Studios, "Oh My Love" was the last song to be recorded for the Imagine LP.

Former Beatle George Harrison contributed guitar on this song and several other songs for the album. His guitar work for the song echoes White Album songs "Julia" and "Happiness Is a Warm Gun".

Ultimate Classic Rock critic Nick DeRiso called "Oh My Love" the most underrated song on Imagine.  Ultimate Classic Rock critic Stephen Lewis rated it as Lennon's 4th greatest solo love song.

"Oh My Love" was also released on Lennon's album Wonsaponatime in 1998, and on the album The U.S. vs. John Lennon in 2006. It is track number 7 on Wonsaponatime and track number 20 on The U.S. vs. John Lennon.

Cover versions
The song has been recorded by numerous artists, including Madness, The Bells, Cilla Black, Jackson Browne, Yoshida Brothers, Susheela Raman, Raimundo Fagner, The Jangles, The Wackers, Yellowcard, Morgan Fisher, Martin Gore, Fredo Viola, Jackson Greenhorn  and Jacky Terrasson with Cécile McLorin Salvant on Terrasson's 2012 album Gouache. A cover version by The Lettermen became a minor hit, peaking at #58 on the Japanese singles chart in 1972.

In popular media
The song has also been used in a couple of films, namely Little Darlings, and several times throughout the film Heartbreakers. The song is on the first season soundtrack to the television show Gilmore Girls.

Personnel 
John Lennon – vocals, piano
George Harrison – electric guitar
Nicky Hopkins – RMI Electra Piano
Klaus Voormann – bass
Alan White – Tibetan cymbals, drums

Notes

External links
 

John Lennon songs
Songs written by John Lennon
Song recordings produced by John Lennon
Song recordings produced by Phil Spector
1971 songs
Song recordings produced by Yoko Ono
Songs written by Yoko Ono
Madness (band) songs
1970s ballads